Nguyễn Văn Cốc (born December 1942) is a former North Vietnamese MiG-21 fighter ace of the Vietnamese People's Air Force's (also known as the North Vietnamese Air Force) 921st Fighter Regiment.

Early life
Nguyễn Văn Cốc was born in December 1942 the Việt Yên District of the province of Bắc Giang in French Indochina, north of Hanoi. When he was five-years-old, his father, Nguyen Van Bay (Chairman of the Viet Minh in the district) and his uncle (also a member of the Viet Minh), were killed by the French. Fearing further trouble with the French, his mother moved the family. Nguyễn spent the rest of his childhood near Chu air base, which kindled an interest in aircraft.

Nguyễn Văn Cốc attended Ngô Sĩ Liên school in Bắc Giang and upon completion of his schooling, enlisted in the Quan Chung Khong Quan (Vietnamese People's Air Force, VPAF) in 1961 and underwent his initial training at Cat Bi Airbase in Haiphong. Nguyễn subsequently spent four years undergoing pilot training in the Soviet Union at the Bataysk and Krasnodar Soviet Air Force bases. Of the 120 trainees dispatched in Nguyễn's draft to the Soviet Union, he was one of seven who graduated as a MiG-17 pilot.

After a brief spell back in North Vietnam serving with the 921st Sao Do (Red Star) Fighter Regiment, he returned to the Soviet Union and underwent conversion training to the MiG-21 in a two-seat Mig-21U, before returning to the 921st Fighter Regiment in June 1965. He began operational flying in December 1965.

On 2 January 1967, he was among a group of pilots who fell into a trap set by the United States Air Forces 8th Tactical Fighter Wing. Nguyễn Văn Cốc and four other Vietnamese pilots were shot down. All ejected safely.

Flying a MIG-21PF, Nguyễn Văn Cốc normally served as a wingman. He scored all his victories using the heat-seeking R-3S Atoll missile.

On June 18, 1969, Nguyễn Văn Cốc was awarded a Huy Hiệu medal for each of his nine claimed kills. The end of Operation Rolling Thunder on 31 October 1968 removed him from the opportunity for further air combat. In early 1970, Nguyễn Văn Cốc was transferred from operational duties to a training academy so that his valuable combat experience could be put to use in training new pilots. Among the pilots he trained was Nguyen Duc Soat.

After the war, Nguyễn Văn Cốc remained with the Vietnamese People's Air Force, retiring with the rank of Chief Inspector in 2002 after declining health.

Air combat victories
Nine air-to-air combat kills of United States aircraft and two AQM-34 Firebee/Lightning Bug UAV kills were credited to him during the Vietnam War. Of these, seven aircraft and two UAV have currently been acknowledged by the United States Air Force. While sometimes U.S. forces may have attributed aircraft losses to surface-to-air missiles, since it was considered "less embarrassing", there was often doubt about cause of the loss.  Coc also claimed an F-4 Phantom and F-105 Thunderchief in November and 17 December 1967 but there are no corresponding American losses stated.

The following kills, while flying the MiG-21, have been credited to Van Coc by the VPAF (aka NVAF):

 30 April 1967: USAF F-105D piloted by Robert A. Abbott of the USAF 355th TFW (POW).  This was his first air victory and occurred while he was acting as a wingman to flight leader Nguyen Ngoc Do, who downed an F-105F.
 23 August 1967: USAF F-4D piloted by Carrigan (POW) with RIO Lane (KIA), 555th TFS.
 07 October 1967: USAF F-105D piloted by Fullam (KIA), 67th TFS.
 18 November 1967: USAF F-105D piloted by Reed (rescued), 388th TFW.

 20 November 1967: USAF F-105; US-side does not confirm.
 12 December 1967: USAF F-105; damaged.

 07 May 1968: On the afternoon of 7 May 1968, three flights of MiG-21 fighters from the VPAF 921st Regiment were flying towards Tho Xuan Air Base, as part of redeployment in response to the U.S. bombing halt above the 19th Parallel. The flights were led by Dang Ngoc Ngu, Nguyen Van Minh and Nguyen Van Coc. Due to the lack of coordination between the different sections of the VPAF 921st Fighter Regiment and the ground-based air-defense forces, the MiG-21 flights were mistakenly identified as U.S. fighter-bombers and were fired upon by North Vietnamese anti-aircraft artillery. Moments later, Ngu also mistook an escorting flight of MiG-21 fighters flown by Nguyen Dang Kinh and Nguyen Van Lung for U.S. fighters. He dropped his fuel tanks to prepare for an attack which was promptly aborted when he realized they were North Vietnamese.

 Later, Ngu and Coc arrived over the skies of Do Luong, north-east of Vinh, and they made three circuits over the area when they were told that enemy aircraft were detected coming from the sea; these were real U.S. fighters. The U.S. flight detected were a formation of five F-4B Phantom II from Fighter Squadron 92 (VF-92), led by Lieutenant Commander Ejnar S. Christensen with his RIO Worth A. Kramer. Over North Vietnamese airspace, a U.S. Navy EKA-3A electronic warfare aircraft tried to jam North Vietnamese communications but failed, and Nhu’s flight of MiG-21 fighters was guided towards their target by ground controllers.

 While trying to engage the VPAF MiGs, the F-4B formation became separated due to confusion in radar control. In the ensuing dogfight, two AIM-7 missiles were fired by the U.S. Navy fighters but missed. Coc was right behind Ngu at the time, but he wanted to disengage from the fight as his aircraft was running low on fuel. The F-4B Phantom II burst into flames and crashed into the sea at 6:44 pm.

 The action gave the VPAF their first aerial victory over the airspace above the Military Zone IV of North Vietnam and gave Nguyen Van Coc his seventh aerial victory. The U.S. Navy confirmed that the downed F-4B had been BuNo 151485, callsign Silver Kite 210, of VF-92 launched from Enterprise. The pilot of BuNo 151485, Lieutenant Commander E.S. Christenson, and his Radar Intercept Officer, Lieutenant (jg) W.A. Kramer ejected safely from their aircraft before impact and were recovered a short time later.
 04 June 1968: USAF AQM-34 Firebee/Lightning Bug unmanned drone.
 08 November 1968: USAF AQM-34 Firebee/Lightning Bug unmanned drone.
 03 August 1969: USAF AQM-34 Firebee/Lightning Bug unmanned drone.
 20 December 1969: A USAF AQM-34 Firebee/Lightning Bug. This could have been an OV-10 Bronco whose two crew died when it was shot down in the same area.

See also
List of Vietnam War flying aces 
Phạm Tuân
Weapons of the Vietnam War

References

Bibliography

External links
Pilot Nguyen Van Coc – The Iron Falcon
Ace Pilots of the Vietnam War
Aces of the Vietnam War photo

1942 births
Living people
North Vietnamese military personnel of the Vietnam War
North Vietnamese Vietnam War flying aces
Vietnamese expatriates in the Soviet Union
People from Bắc Giang Province
Shot-down aviators